Caturus (from  , 'down' and   'tail') is an extinct genus of fishes in the family Caturidae in the order Amiiformes, related to modern bowfin. Fossils of this genus range from 200 to 109 mya. It has been suggested that the genus is non-monophyletic with respect to other caturid genera.

Species
 Caturus agassizi
 Caturus chaperi
 Caturus chirotes
 Caturus dartoni
 Caturus ferox
 Caturus furcatus
 Caturus heterurus
 Caturus insignis
 Caturus latipennis
 Caturus porteri
 Caturus retrodorsalis
 Caturus stenospondylus
 Caturus stenoura
 Caturus velifer

Distribution
This genus is present in the Cretaceous of Germany, Japan, Spain, Tunisia, the United Kingdom, from the Jurassic to Cretaceous of France and the Permian of China.

References

Paleobiology Database
Sepkoski's Online Genus Database

Amiiformes
Prehistoric ray-finned fish genera
Fossil taxa described in 1843
Taxa named by Louis Agassiz